Ramzy Habib El Haq Bedia (born March 10, 1972) is a French actor, screenwriter and film director of Algerian descent.

He started his career as a comedian in 1994 after meeting Eric Judor with whom he formed the duo, Eric et Ramzy. They started their own TV show on the TV channel M6.

In 1998, Bedia and Judor played alongside Jamel Debbouze in the hit French TV series H.
In 1999, he acted in his first movie Le Ciel, les Oiseaux et... ta mère ! by the French director Djamel Bensalah.

Bedia's breakthrough role was as a window cleaner in the 2001 Charles Nemes film La Tour Montparnasse Infernale, which he also co-wrote with Eric Judor.

In 2004 was a busy year for Eric and Ramzy. They starred in the movie Les Dalton as well as the spy comedy Double Zero, directed by Philippe Haïm.
Bedia's other films include Once Upon a Time in the Oued (2005), Bled Number One (2006) and Neuilly Yo Mama! (2009).

Selected filmography

 La Tour Montparnasse Infernale (2001)
 Ratz (2003)
 Pecan Pie (2003)
 Les Dalton (2004)
 Once Upon a Time in the Oued (2005)
 Bled Number One (2006)
 Steak (2007)
 Seuls Two (2008)
 Neuilly sa mère! (2009)
 Le Concert (2009)
 Bacon on the Side (2010)
 Beur sur la ville (2011)
 Headwinds (2011)
 Dream Team (Les Seigneurs) (2012)
 Lolo (2015)
 The New Adventures of Aladdin (2015)
 I'm All Yours (2015)
 Pattaya (2016)
 La Tour 2 contrôle infernale (2016)
 Chacun sa vie et son intime conviction (2017)
 Call My Agent ! (TV series / 1 episode) (2017)
 Coexister (2017)
 Épouse-moi mon pote (2017)
 Alad'2 (2018)
 South Terminal (2019)
 Merveilles à Montfermeil (2020)
 Lost Bullet (2020)

References

External links

 

French male film actors
French humorists
French people of Algerian descent
20th-century French male actors
Living people
1972 births
French male screenwriters
French screenwriters
21st-century French male actors
French film directors
French film producers